John F Nock (born 1875) was an English footballer.

He played for West Bromwich Swifts, Halesowen Town, West Bromwich Albion, Langley Richmond, and Brierley Hill Alliance.

Notes

1875 births
Year of death missing
Sportspeople from West Bromwich
English footballers
Association football forwards
Halesowen Town F.C. players
West Bromwich Albion F.C. players
Brierley Hill Alliance F.C. players
English Football League players